Mullakkadu  is a village in Thoothukudi district in the Indian state of Tamil Nadu and is located about 8 km from Thoothukudi, India, situated near the Indian Ocean.

People of Mullakkadu 

The workers in Mullakkadu leave their homes early in the morning to work in the plantations or towns nearby. Some have their own plantations, and some make certain articles in their homes to sell them in the towns. A few of the villagers, including women, go out to catch fish in the streams and rivers found in the village.

In the afternoon, most of them are at home. Some of them take a nap (Kutti thookam) after lunch, do some work in their small gardens or pay some visits to the small shops in the village. In various parts of the village, children may be found playing the popular games of the village.

In Mullakkadu (Not only in Mullakkadu, almost in all villages) there is a headman (Panchayathu Thalaivar) whose duty is to settle quarrels among the villagers and maintain peace in the village. Whenever there is a dispute, the villagers go to the headman who is held in such esteem that his words have the force of law. In this way, the villagers have developed their own laws, and the crimes of cities are almost unknown to the people of the village.

During a festival, the whole Mullakkadu is alive with activities. This is the time for the men, women, and children of the village to wear their best clothes and the village is full of colour.

The majority of the people in Mullakkadu live on agriculture. They used to harvest paddies, bananas, black grams, etc. Harvest time is certainly the busiest and the merriest time of the year. During the harvest, the villagers often get up very early in the morning. They go to their rice-fields to harvest the bumper crop – the fruit of many months of hard work.

Festivals in Mullakkadu

Uchnimakalli Amman kovil festival
Bathirakaali Amman Kovil Kodai

Vinayagar Chadurthi
Pirammasakthi Palavesakarar swamy kovil kodai
Sudalai Madaswamy Kovil Kodai
Muniyaswamy Kovil Kodai
Pongal
Deepavali
Christmas
Tamil New Year

Hospitals in Mullakkadu

Government Hospital of Mullakkadu
Madheena Hospital

Schools in Mullakkadu

Pottalkadu Primary School. School ID:	31181
R C Savariyarpuram Primary School. School ID:	31182
Sam Nursery & Primary School. School ID:	31183.
T D T A Middle School. Upper Primary. School ID:	31184
 Geetha Matriculation school
 Spic Nagar Matriculation school

Colleges in Mullakkadu

College Name:	GRACE COLLEGE OF ENGINEERING

Address:	CHANDY COLLEGE OF ENGINEERING, CHANDY NAGAR, MULLAKKADU, THOOTHUKUDI 628 005.

Temples in Mullakkadu
Uchinimakalli Amman kovil
Vadabathirakaali Amman Kovil
Noodhana Vinayagar Kovil
Pirammasakthi Amman Kovil
Palavesakara Swamy Kovil
Sudalaimada Swamy Kovil
Muniya Swamy Kovil
Isakki Amman Kovil

Church in Mullakkadu

Dhivya Uyirtheluthalin Aalayam

References 

Villages in Thoothukudi district